Norman Marshall Dennis (born December 10, 1942) is a Canadian retired ice hockey right winger. He played in the NHL for the St. Louis Blues.

External links

1942 births
Canadian ice hockey right wingers
Ice hockey people from Ontario
Living people
Sportspeople from Aurora, Ontario
St. Louis Blues players